This is a list of newspapers in Bermuda.

Bernews (Hamilton, Bermuda) (web only, began publication in 2010)
The Royal Gazette (Hamilton, Bermuda) (daily print and web, began publication in 1828)
 Workers' Voice (published by Bermuda Industrial Union), (Hamilton, Bermuda)

The following were previously published:
The Bermuda Gazette (published from 1784 to 1816) (St. George's, Bermuda) 
Bermuda Sun (published from 1964 to 2014) (Hamilton, Bermuda) 
Mid-Ocean News (published from 1911 to 2009) (Hamilton, Bermuda)

See also
List of newspapers

Newspapers
Bermuda

Newspapers